The qualification for the 2016 Women's Olympic beach volleyball tournament was held from 26 June 2015 to 26 June 2016. A maximum of two teams per country were allowed to qualify. 24 teams from 17 countries qualified.

Qualification summary

Host country

FIVB reserved a vacancy for the Olympics host country to participate in the tournament.
, represented by Larissa França & Talita Antunes

2015 World Championships

The winners from 2015 Beach Volleyball World Championships qualified for the Olympics.

The World Champions were:
  Ágatha Bednarczuk & Bárbara Seixas

Ranking
15 teams qualified from the Olympic Ranking.

Continental Cup
One winner from each Continental Cup qualified for the Olympics. Two teams qualified from the World Continental Cup.

Africa

Final standing:
1. 
2. 
3. 
4. 
5. 
6. 
7. 
8. 
9. 
10. 
  selected Doaa Elghobashy & Nada Meawad to compete in the Olympics.
  and  qualified to the World Continental Cup, but neither played there.

Asia and Oceania

Final standing:
1. 
2. 
3. 
4. 
5. 
5. 
5. 
5. 
  selected Mariafe Artacho & Nicole Laird to compete in the Olympics.
  and  qualified to the World Continental Cup.

Europe

Final standing:
1. 
2. 
3. 
4. 
5. 
5. 
5. 
5. 
  selected Jantine van der Vlist & Sophie van Gestel to compete in the Olympics.
 ,  and  qualified to the World Continental Cup.

North America

Final standing:
1. 
2. 
3. 
4. 
5. 
6. 
7. 
8. 
  selected Nathalia Alfaro & Karen Cope to compete in the Olympics.
  and  qualified to the World Continental Cup, but Cuba did not play there.

South America

Final standing:

1. 
2. 
3. 
4. 
5. 
6. 
  selected Norisbeth Agudo & Olaya Pérez Pazo to compete in the Olympics.
  and  qualified to the World Continental Cup.

World Continental Cup

Winners: 
, who selected Barbora Hermannová & Markéta Sluková
, who selected Ekaterina Birlova & Evgenia Ukolova

See also

Beach volleyball at the 2016 Summer Olympics – Men's qualification
Volleyball at the 2016 Summer Olympics – Women's qualification
Volleyball at the 2016 Summer Olympics – Men's qualification

References

External links

Olympic Qualification Women
Olympic Qualification Women
Volleyball qualification for the 2016 Summer Olympics
2016 in women's volleyball
Vol